Dhul-Suwayqatayn is a figure mentioned in the hadith 1514 of the Islamic prophet Muhammad, according to which a group of Abyssinian (Ethiopian) men are destined to destroy the Kaaba at the end of times. It will be dismantled brick-by-brick, therefore in a peaceful manner. At this time faith in Allah will have disappeared, so the destruction will go unnoticed. The prophecies of Muhammad say they will emerge at the end of time in the second coming of Isa (Jesus Christ).

See also
Dhu al-Qarnayn

References 

  Dihancurkannya Ka'bah oleh Dzu as-Suwayqatayn di Al Sofwah.
  Ensiklopedia Kiamat by Dr. Umar Sulaiman al Asyga on Books Google.
  Tafsir Ibnu Kasir Jilid 1 by Dr.'Abdullah on Books Google.

Islamic eschatology
Islamic terminology